The Lebaudy Morning Post was a French semi-rigid airship built for the British Army in Moisson, France, by  manufacturers Lebaudy Frères. The airship was commissioned by the newspaper The Morning Post, who created a fund to purchase the airship and present it to the British Army. The airship's envelope was damaged on the delivery flight and then it was destroyed on a subsequent trial flight after repair.  At the time of construction it was the largest airship that had been built in France.  By two o'clock it had reached Brighton on the English southern coast, it then travelled north over Horsham towards Aldershot.  It soon approached North Camp at Farnborough for an attempted landing on the common close to the Army Balloon Works. Due to the strong winds it took a number of approaches to the common before troops managed to grab the ropes and secure the airship. The airship was towed to a balloon works shed specially built to house it. It was soon realised it would be a close fit but as it had been measured to fit for the Morning Post all that was required was that care was taken in moving the airship into the shed. With all but ten feet inside the shed, a large hiss was heard as the envelope had caught on a girder. A number of troops were under the airship as it collapsed but nobody was hurt.

Final flight

On 4 May 1911 the Morning Post was on its first flight since being damaged in October 1910 when it was delivered. The airship with a crew of seven was at the end of the one-hour trial flight, it had deployed ropes to allow the soldiers on the ground to bring the ship to the ground, the men could not hold it. The airship drifted into some trees and the envelope burst, causing the airship to collapse over the trees and a house. One of the French mechanics was badly burned but all the crew were rescued from the debris.

Specifications

See also

References

Notes

Bibliography

External links

1910s French military reconnaissance aircraft
Airships of France
Hydrogen airships
Aircraft first flown in 1910